Keith Silverstein is an American voice actor, known for lending his voice to English Versions of Japanese anime and video games, affiliated with Bang Zoom! Entertainment, Viz Media, Studiopolis and Funimation. He is best known for his roles as Johan Liebert in Monster, Vector the Crocodile in the Sonic the Hedgehog video games, Robert E.O. Speedwagon in JoJo's Bizarre Adventure, Hisoka in the 2011 version of Hunter × Hunter, Ōgai Mori in Bungo Stray Dogs, Ulric, Brute, and Rascal in Glitter Force, Gabriel Agreste a.k.a. Hawk Moth (Shadow Moth in season 4 and Monarch in season 5) in Miraculous: Tales of Ladybug & Cat Noir, and Zhongli in Genshin Impact.

Personal life
Silverstein has been married to Rosemary Do since October 10, 2010. They have two daughters.

Filmography

Anime

 86 – Ernst Zimmerman
 Accel World – Red Rider (Previous Red King)
 A.I.C.O. -Incarnation- – Susumu Kurose
 Attack on Titan (season 4) – Roeg
 B-Daman Crossfire – Smash Dragold
 B - The Beginning – Yellow
 Beastars – Gouhin
 Blade of the Immortal – Manji
 Bleach – Coyote Starrk, Aaroniero Arruruerie (Top Skull), Mabashi, Tesra Lindocruz, Tensa Zangetsu
 Blood Lad – Heads Hydra
 Blue Dragon – Lemaire
 Blue Exorcist: Kyoto Saga – Yaozo Shima
 BNA: Brand New Animal – Gem Horner
 Boruto: Naruto Next Generations – Jigen / Isshiki Ōtsutsuki
 Bungo Stray Dogs – Ōgai Mori
 Buso Renkin – Masashi Daihama, Mita
 Cannon Busters – Seezar, Additional Voices
 Charlotte (TV series) – Interpreter (Ep. 11)
 Code Geass – Kewell Soresi, Yoshitaka Minami
 Coppelion – Onihei Mishima
 Devilman Crybaby – Kukun
 Digimon Fusion – Apollomon Whispered
 Doraemon – Mr. S
 Dorohedoro – En
 Drifting Dragons – Gibbs
 Durarara!! – Tom Tanaka
 Eureka Seven – William B. Baxter
 Fate/Apocrypha – Caster of Red
 Glitter Force – Ulric, Brute, Rascal, various
 Ghost in the Shell: SAC 2045 – Standard
 Granblue Fantasy The Animation – Pommern
 Godzilla Singular Point – Gorō Ōtaki
 Gurren Lagann – Makken
 Haré+Guu – Robert
 Honey and Clover – Kazuo Aida, Kazushi Yamazaki, Luigi Fujiwara
 How a Realist Hero Rebuilt the Kingdom – Albert Elfrieden
 Hunter × Hunter 2011 series – Hisoka Morow
 In the Land of Leadale – Kartatz
 Japan Sinks: 2020 – Kōichirō Mutō
 Jujutsu Kaisen – Masamichi Yaga, Ultimate Mechamaru/Kokichi Muta
 JoJo's Bizarre Adventure – Robert E.O. Speedwagon
 K – Mikoto Suoh (Red King), Goki Zenjo
 Kannazuki no Miko – Yukihito
 Kekkaishi – Gagin, Mr. Kurosu, Ohdo (Ep. 4), Spy (Eps. 19 - 20), Takemitsu
 Kengan Ashura – Yohei Bando, Yamashita Kazuo
 Kuroko's Basketball – Mitsuhiro Hayakawa, Kagetora Aida, Kentaro Seto
 Kuromukuro – Imusa, Girolamo Casiraghi
 Lagrange: The Flower of Rin-ne series – Villagulio
 Lost Song – Bazra Bearmors
 Lupin III: Jigen's Gravestone – Lupin
 Magi: The Labyrinth of Magic – Masrur, Goltas (Ep. 2–3, 6)
 Magic☆Hospital! – Dr. Ben Robinson
 Mahoromatic: I'm Home – Kiyomi Kawaguchi, Ryuga
 MÄR – Girom, Boss, Rolan, Danna Toramizu
 March Comes In like a Lion – Takashi Hayashida
 Mob Psycho 100 – Megumu Koyama
 Mobile Suit Gundam: Iron-Blooded Orphans – Chad Chadan
 Mobile Suit Gundam SEED DESTINY HD Remaster – Gilbert Durandal
 Mobile Suit Gundam: The Origin – Char Aznable
 Mobile Suit Gundam Unicorn – Full Frontal, Char Aznable
 Monster – Johan Liebert
 Naruto – Kimimaro, Gantetsu
 Naruto: Shippuden – Kimimaro, Yura, Ginkaku, Kusune (Ep. 184), Sukune (Ep. 187), Kyūsuke, Young Hagoromo Ōtsutsuki
 Nura: Rise of the Yokai Clan series – Zen, Nurarihyon (Young), Mokugyo Daruma, Inuhōō
 One-Punch Man – Deep Sea King
 Paradise Kiss – Konishi, Noriji
 Phantom the Animation – Zwei (credited as David Keefir)
 Pokémon Evolutions – Professor Oak
 Pokémon: Twilight Wings – Chairman Rose
 The Prince of Tennis II: Hyotei vs. Rikkai Game of Future – Yushi Oshitari
 Rozen Maiden – Detective Kun-Kun
 Rozen Maiden: Träumend – Laplace's Demon, Shirosaki, Detective Kun-Kun
 Sailor Moon – Kenji Tsukino (Viz dub), Old Fortuneteller (Ep. 2), Yusuke (Ep. 6), Professor Tomoe (Viz dub)
 Sailor Moon Crystal – Kenji Tsukino, Professor Tomoe
 Samurai Champloo – Sunobi, Pinwheel Peddler
 Saiyuki Reload Gunlock – Yakumo
 The Seven Deadly Sins (season 1) – Monspeet
 Shaman King (2021 TV series) – Mikihisa
 Skip Beat! – Takenori Sawara 
 Stitch! – Gantu, Yuna's father
 Strait Jacket – Jack Roland
 Sword Art Online – Shozo Yuki (Asuna's Father, Ep. 15), Kagemune (Ep. 16, 20), G-Takusu (Ep. 19)
 Tenjho Tenge – Iwaki Kenjirou
 Tiger & Bunny – Cain Morris, B-Bomber
 Tokko – Akito
 Tokyo 24th Ward – Wataru Chikushi
 The Seven Deadly Sins: Revival of The Commandments – Monspeet
 Vinland Saga – Floki (Netflix dub)
 Violet Evergarden – Dietfried Bougainvillea
 Yashahime: Princess Half-Demon – Nanahoshi
 Your Lie in April – Kazuma
 Zetman – Seiji Haitani
 The Asterisk War – Ar-D

Animation

 Amphibia – Barry
 Batgirl: Year One – Robin/Dick Grayson
 Fresh Beat Band of Spies – Commissioner Goldstar, Poulet, Additional Voices
 Miraculous Ladybug – Gabriel Agreste/Hawk Moth; Prince Ali
 Little People – Baker Bob, Recycler Rick
 Monster High: Escape from Skull Shores – Bartleby Farnum
 Monsuno – Dax, Commander Trey
 Mortal Kombat Legends: Snow Blind – Kabal
 NFL Rush Zone: Season of the Guardians – Giants Rusher, Cardinals Rusher, Steeler Stan, Hank the Guard
 Rainbow Butterfly Unicorn Kitty – Town Crier, Various
 Sonic Boom – Vector the Crocodile
 Special Agent Oso – Faith's Dad
 Sesame Street – Ziggy the rapping Zebrasaurus
 Teenage Mutant Ninja Turtles – Kirby O'Neil
 Transformers: War for Cybertron Trilogy – Jetfire, Omega Supreme, Deseeus (Death)
 Tron: Uprising – Additional Voices
 Wakfu – Ruel Stroud (season 3)
 Zak Storm – Skullivar (credited as David Roach)

Films
 A Whisker Away – Cat Storekeeper
 Bleach: The DiamondDust Rebellion – Sōjirō Kusaka
 Bubble – Shin
 Case Closed: The Fist of Blue Sapphire – Shuichi Akai
 Child of Kamiari Month – Kotoshironushi, additional voices
 Godzilla: Planet of the Monsters — Unberto Mori
 Godzilla: City on the Edge of Battle – Unberto Mori
 Godzilla: The Planet Eater – Unberto Mori
 Hoodwinked Too! Hood vs. Evil – Additional Voices
 Hotel Transylvania 3 – Additional Voices
 The Jungle Bunch – Igor
 Jungle Master – Additional Voices
 Tyler Perry's Madea's Tough Love – Helicopter Cop
 My Hero Academia: Two Heroes – Wolfram
 Oblivion Island: Haruka and the Magic Mirror – Haruka's Father (credited as David Roach)
 One Piece Film: Gold – Gild Tesoro
 Penguin Highway – Aoyama's father
 Redline – Johnny Bova
 Violet Evergarden: The Movie – Dietfried Bougainvillea
 Doraemon: Nobita's New Great Adventure into the Underworld – Teacher

Live-action dubbing
 Azumi 2: Death or Love – Tsuchigamo
 Better than Us – Victor Toropov
 Masquerade – Park Choong-seo
 Sesame Street – Ziggy the Rapping Zebrasaurus
 Violetta – Gregorio

Foreign show dubbing

Video games

Web series
 Timber Wolf – Loopy T. Wolf, Igor Beaver, Dash Snake, Termite
 Pencil and Parsecs – K'lev

References

External links
 
 
 
 

Living people
21st-century American male actors
Audiobook narrators
African-American male actors
American male video game actors
American male radio actors
American male voice actors
21st-century African-American people
1970 births